Korey Foreman is an American football Defensive Lineman for the USC Trojans.

High school career 
Foreman attended Centennial High School in Corona, California. As a senior, Foreman was named to the All-American bowl although the game was not held due to the COVID-19 pandemic. A consensus top 5 prospect, USA Today ranked him the #1 recruit in the country for the class of 2021.  He originally committed to play college football at Clemson, before de-committing in order to take more college visits, as Clemson head coach Dabo Swinney has a policy that players committed to Clemson cannot take additional visits. On January 2, 2021, he committed to the University of Southern California over Clemson, Georgia, Arizona State and LSU, citing the school's proximity to his hometown, and the NIL opportunities that playing in Los Angeles would provide to him as key factors to his decision. Foreman's father has stated that Foreman held a makeshift raffle in order to decide where to attend college, drawing a ball with USC's logo out of a hat.

College career 
Foreman received limited playing time in what was later described as a "frustrating" freshman season, finishing the year with 11 tackles, 3.5 tackles for loss and 2.5 sacks. In his sophomore season Foreman once again struggled to see the field, largely due to injuries and inconsistent play. In the Trojans ranked showdown against crosstown rival UCLA, Foreman had the best game of his career, playing the majority of the game and having a game-clinching interception late in the 4th quarter of the Trojans victory. He finished the season with 13 tackles and one tackle for a loss.

References

External links 

 USC Trojans bio

USC Trojans football players
Sportspeople from Corona, California
Players of American football from California
Living people
American football linebackers
Year of birth missing (living people)